Friedrich Anton Hermann Schievelbein (18 November 1817 – 6 May 1867) was a German sculptor.

Life 
He was the son of a master carpenter and lost his parents early, growing up in the home of an older sister. His artistic education began with the landscape painter Carl Friedrich Trautmann (1804-1875). Afterwards, he attended the Prussian Academy of Art from 1835 to 1838, where he studied with the sculptor Ludwig Wilhelm Wichmann. After graduating, he spent three years in Saint Petersburg, helping to decorate Saint Isaac's Cathedral and the Winter Palace.

Two years later, he received the "Großen Staatspreis" for a figure of Merope about to kill her son Aepytus. The prize included a stipend that enabled him to travel in Italy. He broke off the trip in 1844 and returned early, having received a commission for a figure on the Schloßbrücke (Castle Bridge) in Berlin-Mitte. In 1860, he was appointed a professor at the academy, and became a member of its governing senate in 1866. In addition to his large-scale works, he also created sculptural decorations at the terracotta factory of Ernst March.

A persistent chest ailment forced him to take frequent curative trips to the south. He died of pleurisy, aged only fifty.

Selected major works 

 1845-1847: Zinc statues of four of the Apostles on the Helsinki Cathedral
 1850/1851: Terra cotta reliefs Auszug der Krieger (Retreat of the Warrior) and Heimkehr des siegreichen Heeres (Return of the Victorious Army) on the base of the Triumphal Arch, Potsdam   
 1853: Statue Athene unterrichtet den Jungen im Gebrauch der Waffen (Athena Instructing a Young Warrior), on the Schloßbrücke.
 1863/1864: Models for allegorical figures representing six of the months, on the West and East wings of the Orangery Palace in Potsdam.
 1867−1869: Monument for Heinrich Friedrich Karl vom und zum Stein, formerly on the Dönhoffplatz on the Leipziger Straße, now in front of the Abgeordnetenhaus (House of Representatives) in Berlin.

References

External links 

 Helsing Taidemuseo: The Twelve Apostles on Helsinki Cathedral (in English)
 Museumsportal Berlin: Schievelbeins Fries "Die Zerstörung Pompejis". Eine Katastrophe mit glücklichem Ausgang
 "Hermann Schievelbein", in The History of Sculpture by Wilhelm Lübke via Google Books

1817 births
1867 deaths
German sculptors
German male sculptors
Artists from Berlin
Prussian Academy of Arts alumni
19th-century sculptors